Don McDougall (born December 15, 1937) is a Canadian businessman. He served as president of the Labatt Brewing Company, and led the group that successfully lobbied for a Major League Baseball expansion team, the Toronto Blue Jays.

Biography
McDougall was born in Charlottetown, Prince Edward Island. He graduated from Saint Dunstan's University with a bachelor's degree, and earned his MBA from the University of Western Ontario.

He worked in several managerial positions for the Labatt Brewing Company, before being named the company's president in 1973. He resigned in 1980 to run for office in the federal elections as a member of the Progressive Conservative Party of Canada.

One of his tasks as president was to secure a Major League Baseball franchise for the brewery and the city of Toronto. He had to overcome a failed attempt to bring the San Francisco Giants to the city, and also had to fend off a rival group of businessmen with the same goal of bringing baseball north. He was part of the team that eventually brought the Toronto Blue Jays into existence in 1976, and was the club's founding director.

McDougall is a brother of Pat Mella, who served as leader of the Progressive Conservative Party of Prince Edward Island from 1990 to 1996.

Honors and affiliations 
 In 2002, McDougall was inducted into the Canadian Baseball Hall of Fame.
 In 2008, the University of Prince Edward Island named a new building after McDougall and his wife, Marion, to honour their commitment to higher learning and philanthropic efforts.
 In 2009, he was inducted into the London Business Hall of Fame.
 In 2014, the University of Prince Edward Island installed McDougall as Chancellor.
 In 2014, he is a member of the University of Waterloo Stratford Campus Advisory Board.

References

1937 births
Living people
Businesspeople from Prince Edward Island
People from Charlottetown
Saint Dunstan's University alumni
University of Western Ontario alumni
Labatt Brewing Company
Canadian Baseball Hall of Fame inductees